Adelaide, Abbess of Vilich (c. 970 – 5 February 1015(?), her date of birth and death are controversial), also known as Adelheid, was the abbess of Vilich and also of St. Maria im Kapitol in Cologne; she was declared a saint post-mortem. After her death, she was remembered for the miracles that were ascribed to her. Her parents were Megingoz, count of Guelders, and Gerberga, who was a descendant of German king Henry the Fowler. They were also the founders of the convent at Vilich. The main source for her life is the hagiographical work Vita Adelheidis.

Life
Adelaide was born around 970, the youngest daughter of Megengoz, Count of Geldern, and his wife Gerberga. As a child, she was given to the convent of St. Ursula in Cologne, probably before 977, where she was educated according to the Rule of St Jerome, and engaged in philosophical studies, according to her Vita. When her older brother Godfrey died in battle in 977, her parents began funding the construction of a church in his honour at Vilich (today part of Bonn-Beuel) and worked to establish a female monastic community following the rule of the observances of the canonesses. As part of this process, they redeemed their daughter from St Ursula with a gift of land and established her as abbess of the newly founded community at Vilich.

To determine Vilich's legal position in the empire, her parents appealed to emperor Otto III in 987 to obtain a charter granting Vilich the same legal status as the imperial convents of Gandersheim, Quedlinburg, and Essen. This charter was confirmed by a papal bull from Pope Gregory VI, dated 24 May 996.

Due to the death of her mother Geberga in c.995, Adelaide was forced to lead the convent by herself. She used this position of power to change the rule of Vilich to the Rule of Saint Benedict despite some canonesses of the convent resisting this change and leaving Vilich. Three years after Gerberga's death, Adelaide's father Megengoz died as well. He was buried alongside his wife at Vilich. Adelaide inherited a large part of the family's wealth. Some of it was used to buy land for the convent while the remaining funds were given to the poor in a charitable act.

In c.1000, Adelaide's sister Bertrada, abbess of St Mary in the Capitol died. Archbishop Heribert of Cologne expressed wishes for Adelaide to assume responsibility for the abbey. Initially, Adelaide declined the offer allegedly due to the distance between Vilich and St Mary in the Capitol. Despite this, Archbishop Heribert of Cologne managed to enforce his wish by contacting the emperor in Aachen. It is not clear from the Vita Adelheidis if this had been emperor Otto III or Henry II. Adelaide was subsequently called to the court and confirmed as abbess of St Mary in the Capitol. Adelaide's new position led to her charitable work in Vilich becoming well-known in the city of Cologne. Her favourable reputation increased after bad harvests in the following years, during which Adelaide cared for the people in Cologne. While her relationship with Archbishop Heribert is described by the vita as one of caritas, the sisters at Vilich are depicted as feeling neglected due to Adelaide spending time in Cologne.

On 5 February of an unknown year, Adelaide died of a sore throat in the company of her friend Archbishop Heribert. Her sisters from Vilich did not believe a message describing Adelaide's illness and arrived after she had died. Archbishop Heribert wished for Adelaide to be buried in Cologne, but the sisters convinced him to have her buried in Vilich.

Sources 
One of the main sources of Adelaide's life is the Vita Adelheidis virginis. The vita is a hagiographical source that also includes information on Adelaide's family and the convent of Vilich itself. It was written around 1057 by Bertha with the aid of contemporary witnesses. Bertha appears to have written the Vita before entering the convent of Vilich. The Vita is directed to Anno II, archbishop of Cologne (1056-1075). In the Vita of Bertha's brother, Wolfhelm, it is documented that Bertha wrote the Vita Adelheidis alongside other vitae.

Much information from the vita is supported by different charters; mainly by a charter from 944, in which Otto I. restores  Megingoz's property, and by a charter from 987 by which Otto III. grants the Abbey of Vilich the status of Reichsstift (imperial convent).

Veneration
During her term of office, the region around Cologne was affected by famines. Therefore, she prayed for the poorest and as a result, a source of water arose in the district of Pützchen in modern-day Bonn. The source was transformed into a well and it became an important pilgrimage destination for the worship of Adelheid. This fountain has been preserved until today; every year in September, there is a pilgrimage in veneration of Adelheid. In 1641, her grave in the Vilicher Stiftskirche was opened and it was empty. After this discovery, the number of pilgrims fell sharply, but every year a few relics were and still are shown to the public.

Besides this well, some other miracles have been recorded, which are supposed to have taken place at her grave. Adelaide was canonized by Pope Paul VI on 27 January 1966. As her day of death, the 5th of February was confirmed as the official day of her remembrance and feast day.

Even today, several churches and monasteries in Bonn and Cologne, as well as several schools, are named after her. On 8 September 2008 Adelaide was proclaimed the third city patron saint of Bonn.

See also
Catholic Church in Germany
List of Catholic saints

References

External links

Matrix Monasticon: Adelheid and Vilich
Saint Adelaide of Guelders

970s births
1015 deaths
Benedictine nuns
Medieval German saints
Female saints of medieval Germany
11th-century Christian saints
10th-century German abbesses
11th-century German abbesses